Nemanja Stevanović (born 8 May 1992) is a Serbian football goalkeeper who plays for FK Partizan.

Career
Stevanović played with Jedinstvo Mali Zvornik, Rad, BASK, and Čukarički between 2012 and 2016. He saved two penalties from Bojan Božović on his Serbian SuperLiga debut against Napredak Kruševac on 9 August 2014.

Stevanović was declared as the best goalkeeper for the first half of the 2015–16 season.

On 29 July 2016, Stevanović signed four-year contract with Partizan.

On 31 August 2017, Stevanović moved on six-month loan deal to Teleoptik.

Career statistics

Honours
BASK
 Serbian First League: 2010–11
Čukarički
 Serbian Cup: 2014–15
Partizan
 Serbian SuperLiga: 2016–17
 Serbian Cup: 2016–17

References

External links
 Nemanja Stevanović stats at utakmica.rs 
 
 
 

1992 births
Living people
Sportspeople from Loznica
Association football goalkeepers
Serbian footballers
FK BASK players
FK Čukarički players
FK Partizan players
FK Teleoptik players
FK Rad players
Serbian First League players
Serbian SuperLiga players